Anne Marden (born June 12, 1958) is a rower from the United States. She was born in Boston, Massachusetts.

Early competition
Anne started rowing at Phillips Exeter Academy in the spring of 1974 age 15. She rowed at Princeton University where she met up with coach Kris Korzeniowski in 1977 and developed a love for sculling despite being caught in a serious hailstorm in Lake Carnegie (New Jersey). After Kris Korzeniowski (1977–1981), Anne was coached by Jean Pierre Leroux of Fontainebleau, France (1985–1988) and by Hartmut Buschbacher of Germany (1991–1992). Anne trained on the Seine in France in 1985 and from 1986–1993 rowed mainly on the Tideway in London, England as well as the Wallingford stretch of the River Thames. After 18 months in France to study for an MBA at INSEAD (Dec 1985 – April 1986), Anne moved to London in May 1986. By the time her rowing career came to an end in 1993 she had won the women's championship single at Boston's Head of the Charles Regatta 7 times (1986–1993 with 1990 skipped owing to late world championships in Australia).

Olympian
Marden qualified for the 1980 U.S. Olympic team but was unable to compete due to the 1980 Summer Olympics boycott. She did however receive one of 461 Congressional Gold Medals created especially for the spurned athletes. She competed for the United States in the 1984 Summer Olympics held in Los Angeles, California in the quadruple sculls event where she finished in second place.  At the 1988 Summer Olympics held in Seoul, South Korea she finished in second place in the single sculls event.  Four years later in the Barcelona Olympics she missed out on a third medal finishing fourth in the single sculls.

Career
When she competed for the US Olympic Rowing team in Seoul and Barcelona she was living in the United Kingdom and working for JPMorgan/London.

See also
 List of Princeton University Olympians

References

External links
 

1958 births
Olympic silver medalists for the United States in rowing
Rowers at the 1984 Summer Olympics
Rowers at the 1988 Summer Olympics
Rowers at the 1992 Summer Olympics
Living people
American female rowers
World Rowing Championships medalists for the United States
Medalists at the 1988 Summer Olympics
Medalists at the 1984 Summer Olympics
Pan American Games medalists in rowing
Pan American Games gold medalists for the United States
Congressional Gold Medal recipients
Rowers at the 1983 Pan American Games
21st-century American women